The Cowboy and the Lady is a lost 1915 silent feature film directed by Edwin Carewe and distributed by Metro Pictures. The film is based on Clyde Fitch's successful Broadway play that starred Maxine Elliott. Several versions of the story followed this film.

Plot

Cast
 S. Miller Kent as Ted North
 Helen Case as Margaret Primrose
 Gertrude Short
 Fred Hornby as (billed Fred W. Hornby)
 Bert Hadley
 William Ryno
 Edith Stevens

References

External links
 
 
 

1915 films
American films based on plays
Lost Western (genre) films
Films directed by Edwin Carewe
1915 Western (genre) films
American black-and-white films
Lost American films
Metro Pictures films
1915 lost films
Silent American Western (genre) films
1910s American films
1910s English-language films